Salesianum School is a Catholic independent school for boys located in Wilmington, Delaware. It is run independently within the Diocese of Wilmington and is operated by the Oblates of St. Francis de Sales.

The current enrollment is about 930 students, declining from a peak of about 1,100 in recent years, from Delaware, Maryland, New Jersey, and Pennsylvania. Salesianum has established a close connection with Lycée Saint Michel, another Oblate high school, located in Annecy, France. Salesianum was named one of the Top 50 Catholic High Schools in America by the Catholic Honor Roll in 2004, 2007, 2008, 2009, and 2010.

Campus
The  campus is home to the school itself as well as a gymnasium.  In addition to the campus, the athletic program also makes use of Wilmington's newly constructed Abessinio Stadium formerly Baynard Stadium which is located directly across from the school.

Athletics
Salesianum School has won 153 Delaware Interscholastic Athletic Association (DIAA) approved boys' state championships, winning its first state championship in basketball in 2014.

Salesianum's historical rival is St. Mark's High School, which is located in suburban Wilmington. Their fall meeting in football is commonly referred to as "The Holy War".

The soccer team won 11 state championships between 2002 and 2014, and in 2013 defeated Saint Benedict's Preparatory School, the top ranked high school program in the nation, on a game-winning goal scored by Joseph Dolce. They finished the season ranked as the number two high school team in the country. The 2016 soccer team finished the season ranked sixth in the nation by USA Today on its final Super 25 Expert Rankings.

The cross country team has won 37 of the 42 DIAA state boys' championships, losing only five years between 1972 and 2013.

The Salesianum swimming team has won ten consecutive state boys' championships between 2005 and 2015 and 11 of the last 12 from 2005-2017

History
Salesianum (Latin for "House of Sales", referring to St. Francis de Sales) was founded in 1903 and was located at 8th and West Streets until the move to its current location in 1957. In 1950, Rev. Thomas Lawless, OSFS, a 1908 graduate of Salesianum, admitted five African American students four years prior to the Brown v. Board of Education decision which made it mandatory, thus making Salesianum the first racially integrated school in the state of Delaware. The school was recognized for this with a historical marker.

In August 2012 the Wilmington/Philadelphia Province of the Oblates of St. Francis de Sales published a letter stating, "Since 2004, the Wilmington/Philadelphia Province of the Oblates of St. Francis de Sales has been named in lawsuits in the Superior Court of Delaware filed by 40 plaintiffs, each of which contained allegations of sexual abuse of a minor." The letter named 12 oblates who had been involved and expressed regrets, stating, "The abuse of children by priests and other clergy is shocking, reprehensible, and devastating to all whose trust has been shattered by their selfish deeds." This followed a settlement in August 2011 of 39 lawsuits against the school and the order, with the order and its insurers paying $24.8 million to be shared between the plaintiffs.

Notable alumni

 

 David Acord (1989): sound editor at Skywalker Sound; nominated for Academy Award for sound editing for Star Wars: The Force Awakens and Star Wars: The Rise of Skywalker; won Primetime Emmy for Outstanding Sound Editing for a Comedy or Drama Series (Half-Hour) and Animation (2020) for The Mandalorian: "Chapter 1: The Mandalorian"
 Miguel A. Bezos (1963): father of Jeff Bezos
 Hugh T. Broomall (1966): United States Air Force Major General
 Stephen Mallozzi (2019): NASCAR Camping World Truck Series Driver
 Neil Casey (2000): actor and writer, Ghostbusters (2016), Inside Amy Schumer
 Christopher Castellani (1990): novelist
 Steve Casula (2005):NCAA football coach; Currently the offensive coordinator at UMass
 Cesidio Colasante (1993): NPSL midfielder
 James J. Connell (1957): Lieutenant commander in the United States Navy, recipient of the Navy Cross. POW in the Vietnam War. Inducted into Delaware Aviation Hall of Fame in 2019
 Simon Diamond (Pat Kenney): professional wrestler
 Joseph diGenova (1963): United States Attorney for the District of Columbia (1983-1988) 
 Donte DiVincenzo (2015): NBA player, currently with the Golden State Warriors, drafted 17th overall by the Bucks in the 2018 NBA Draft, played college basketball at Villanova, winning national championships in 2016 and 2018
 Charles J. Dunlap Jr. (1968): Major General, United States Air Force; professor at Duke University law school
 James V. Fiorelli (1958): Colonel, United States Air Force; earned the Silver Star for actions during the Vietnam War, as well as three Distinguished Flying Crosses, and the Air Medal with 26 oak leaf clusters. Inducted into Delaware Aviation Hall of Fame in 2013
 Will Fetters (1999): screenwriter, Hustle, A Star is Born (2018), The Best of Me, The Lucky One, Remember Me
 David J. Kelly (1995): screenwriter, Robin Hood (2018)
 Albert "Jim" Madora (1964): Major General, United States Army
 Bill Marsilii (1980): screenwriter, Déjà Vu, Courage the Cowardly Dog
 Charlie McDermott (attended for two years, left in 2006): actor, best known for the role of Axel Heck in the sitom The Middle
 Bernie McInerney (1954): actor, played old man on scooter in Paul Blart: Mall Cop
 Anthony Monaco, M.D., Ph.D. (1977): President of Tufts University; geneticist
 Brian O'Neill (2014): National Football League offensive lineman
 Donald E. Pease, Ph.D. (1963): Professor of English, Darmouth College. Scholar of Dr. Seuss. Author: Theodor Geisel: A Portrait of the Man Who Becam Dr. Seuss (2010), The New American Exceptionalism (2009)
 Bill Press (1958): political commentator and talk radio host, chair of the California Democratic Party (1993–1996)
 Michael Reed (1990): National Football League player, defensive back coach at Clemson University
 Troy Reeder (2014): National Football League linebacker 
 Kevin P. Reilly (1969): National Football League linebacker
 Edward J. Scully (1958): Lieutenant Colonel, United States Army. Served in the Vietnam War in the United States Army Special Forces, also known as the Green Berets. Inducted into the Delaware Aviation Hall of Fame in 2017
 Andrew Szczerba (2007): National Football League tight end
 Ken Szotkiewicz (1965): Major League Baseball shortstop
 Timothy Szymanski (1980): retired United States Navy vice admiral; retired Navy S.E.A.L.; former commander of United States Naval Special Warfare Command in Coronado, California
 John Tosi ( 1933): American football offensive lineman
  Thomas Turcol (1971): 1985 Pulitzer Prize winner for General News Reporting
 Francis D. Vavala (1965): United States Army Lieutenant General and adjutant general for Delaware 
 Tom Welling (attended as a freshman in 1992): actor, best known for the role of Clark Kent/Superman in the show Smallville
 Victor Zwolak (1956): 1964 Olympic runner

References

External links 

 

Educational institutions established in 1903
Boys' schools in Delaware
High schools in New Castle County, Delaware
Salesian secondary schools
Catholic secondary schools in Delaware
Schools in Wilmington, Delaware
Roman Catholic Diocese of Wilmington
1903 establishments in Delaware